The 1937 Princeton Tigers football team was an American football team that represented Princeton University as an independent during the 1937 college football season. In its sixth and final season under head coach Fritz Crisler, the team compiled a 4–4 record and was outscored by a total of 126 to 96. The team played its home games at Palmer Stadium in Princeton, New Jersey.

Tackle Charlie Toll was the team captain. Halfback Jack H. White received the John Prentiss Poe Cup, the team's highest award. No Princeton players were selected by the Associated Press to the 1937 All-Eastern college football team. 

On February 9, 1938, Crisler announced his resignation at Princeton in order to assume the head coaching position at the University of Michigan.

Schedule

References

Princeton
Princeton Tigers football seasons
Princeton Tigers football